The 1997 WNBA season was the first season for the Los Angeles Sparks. The Sparks finished in second place in the Western Division with a record of 14 wins and 14 losses.

Offseason

Initial Player Allocation

WNBA Draft

Regular season
The Sparks and WNBA's first game was played on June 21, 1997, in Los Angeles. The Sparks lost to the New York Liberty, 67-57. The attendance at the Forum was 14,284.

Season standings

Season Schedule

|- style="background:#fbb;"
| 1
| June 21
| New York
| L 57-67
| Leslie (16)
| Leslie (14)
| Wideman (6)
| Great Western Forum
| 0-1
|- style="background:#fbb;"
| 2
| June 23
| @ Utah
| L 89-102
| Leslie (22)
| Leslie (10)
| Wideman (7)
| Delta Center
| 0-2
|- style="background:#bfb;"
| 3
| June 25
| Charlotte
| W 74-54
| Leslie (19)
| Leslie, Toler (5)
| Toler (7)
| Great Western Forum
| 1-2
|- style="background:#bfb;"
| 4
| June 27
| Sacramento
| W 93-73
| Haixia (28)
| Haixia (10)
| Toler, Wideman (7)
| Great Western Forum
| 2-2
|- style="background:#fbb;"
| 5
| June 30
| @ Houston
| L 66-71 (OT)
| Leslie (21)
| Leslie (16)
| Toler (5)
| The Summit
| 2-3
|-

|- style="background:#bfb;"
| 6
| July 3
| @ Cleveland
| W 74-62
| Leslie (19)
| Leslie (7)
| Wideman (6)
| Gund Arena
| 3-3
|- style="background:#fbb;"
| 7
| July 5
| @ Charlotte
| L 66-78
| Leslie (16)
| Leslie, Toler (7)
| Wideman (6)
| Charlotte Coliseum
| 3-4
|- style="background:#fbb;"
| 8
| July 7
| Cleveland
| L 70-81
| Leslie (22)
| Leslie (9)
| Wideman (8)
| Great Western Forum
| 3-5
|- style="background:#bfb;"
| 9
| July 11
| Utah
| W 75-68
| Burgess (20)
| Burge, Burgess (9)
| Leslie, Toler (6)
| Great Western Forum
| 4-5
|- style="background:#fbb;"
| 10
| July 13
| Phoenix
| L 56-57
| Burgess (12)
| Burge (11)
| Burge, Toler, Dixon, Charles, Colleton (2)
| Great Western Forum
| 4-6
|- style="background:#fbb;"
| 11
| July 15
| @ Sacramento
| L 73-78
| Leslie (17)
| Burgess, Leslie (5)
| Toler (10)
| Arco Arena
| 4-7
|- style="background:#bfb;"
| 12
| July 16
| Houston
| W 77-52
| Haixia (15)
| Leslie (10)
| Leslie (5)
| Great Western Forum
| 5-7
|- style="background:#fbb;"
| 13
| July 19
| @ New York
| L 57-69
| Toler (14)
| Leslie (7)
| Wideman (4)
| Madison Square Garden
| 5-8
|- style="background:#fbb;"
| 14
| July 21
| @ Charlotte
| L 64-75
| Leslie (18)
| Toler (8)
| Leslie, Toler (4)
| Charlotte Coliseum
| 5-9
|- style="background:#fbb;"
| 15
| July 23
| Cleveland
| L 85-89
| Leslie (28)
| Leslie (13)
| Colleton (5)
| Great Western Forum
| 5-10
|- style="background:#bfb;"
| 16
| July 25
| @ Phoenix
| W 86-83 (OT)
| Leslie (17)
| Leslie (8)
| Toler, Wideman (4)
| America West Arena
| 6-10
|- style="background:#bfb;"
| 17
| July 27
| @ Sacramento
| W 84-62
| Dixon (20)
| Leslie (9)
| Toler (9)
| Arco Arena
| 7-10
|- style="background:#bfb;"
| 18
| July 30
| Utah
| W 91-69
| Leslie (23)
| Leslie (11)
| Leslie (7)
| Great Western Forum
| 8-10
|-

|-  style="text-align:center; background:#fbb;"
| 19
| August 1
| Houston
| L 57-81
| Toler (17)
| Leslie (6)
| Toler (3)
| Great Western Forum
| 8-11
|-  style="text-align:center; background:#fbb;"
| 20
| August 3
| Charlotte
| L 70-77
| Toler (19)
| Leslie (10)
| Toler (7)
| Great Western Forum
| 8-12
|- style="background:#bfb;"
| 21
| August 5
| @ New York
| W 67-50
| Toler, Dixon (16)
| Leslie (14)
| Toler (3)
| Madison Square Garden
| 9-12
|- style="background:#bfb;"
| 22
| August 7
| @ Cleveland
| W 87-84 (2OT)
| Dixon (23)
| Leslie (14)
| Leslie (5)
| Gund Arena
| 10-12
|- style="background:#fbb;"
| 23
| August 9
| @ Houston
| L 71-72
| Dixon (21)
| Haixia (7)
| Toler (4)
| The Summit
| 10-13
|- style="background:#bfb;"
| 24
| August 16
| @ Utah
| W 74-64
| Leslie (23)
| Leslie (12)
| Toler (8)
| Delta Center
| 11-13
|- style="background:#bfb;"
| 25
| August 18
| Phoenix
| W 75-66
| Leslie (26)
| Leslie (15)
| Toler (8)
| Great Western Forum
| 12-13
|- style="background:#bfb;"
| 26
| August 20
| New York
| W 78-76
| Toler (17)
| Haixia (9)
| Toler (6)
| Great Western Forum
| 13-13
|- style="background:#bfb;"
| 27
| August 22
| Sacramento
| W 88-77
| Haixia (21)
| Leslie (12)
| Toler (8)
| Great Western Forum
| 14-13
|- style="background:#fbb;"
| 28
| August 24
| @ Phoenix
| L 68-73 (OT)
| Dixon (25)
| Leslie (14)
| Toler (4)
| America West Arena
| 14-14
|-

Player stats

Tamecka Dixon was tied for tenth in the WNBA in steals with 49. 
Tamecka Dixon ranked tenth in the WNBA in Field Goal Percentage (.456)
Lisa Leslie ranked third in the WNBA in points with 445 points.
Lisa Leslie ranked third in the WNBA in points per game with 15.9
Lisa Leslie ranked fifth in the WNBA in field goals with 160. 
Lisa Leslie ranked first in the WNBA in total rebounds with 266.
Lisa Leslie ranked second in the WNBA in blocks with 59.
Penny Toler ranked tenth in the WNBA in points with 368 points.
Penny Toler ranked eighth in the WNBA in field goals with 144.
Penny Toler ranked tenth in the WNBA in points per game with 13.1
Penny Toler ranked sixth in the WNBA in Free Throw Pct with .839 
Penny Toler ranked second in the WNBA in assists with 143. 
Jamila Wideman ranked seventh in the WNBA in assists with 103. 
Haixia Zheng ranked ninth in the WNBA in blocks with 20.

Awards and honors
 Lisa Leslie, Center, All WNBA First Team 
Lisa Leslie: Led WNBA, Defensive Rebounds, 203
Lisa Leslie: Led WNBA, Total Rebounds, 266
Lisa Leslie: Led WNBA, Rebounds per game, 9.5
Lisa Leslie ranked second in the WNBA with 2.1 blocks per game.
Lisa Leslie ranked third in the WNBA with 113 Free Throws.
 Haixia Zheng, WNBA Peak Performer
 Haixia Zheng, Kim Perrot Sportsmanship Award
Haixia Zheng: Led WNBA, Field Goal Percentage, .618

References

Sparks on Basketball Reference

Los Angeles Sparks seasons
Los Angeles Sparks
Los Angeles